The Provinces of Saudi Arabia, also known as Regions, and officially the Emirates of the Provinces of the Kingdom of Saudi Arabia, are the 13 first-level administrative divisions of the Kingdom of Saudi Arabia.

History
After the unification of Saudi Arabia, the kingdom was divided into seven provinces: the 'Asir Province, Al Hasa' Province, the Hejaz Province, the Najd Province, the Rub' al-Khali Province and the Shammar Province. 

King Fahd bin Abdulaziz Al Saud issued Royal Order A/92 on March 2, 1992, known as the Regions' System, which provided for the division of the kingdom into 13 emirates. Subsequently, the five previous provinces were divided into thirteen geographic regions, called provinces (manātiq) and administrative regions, called the emirates of the provinces (imārāt al-manātiq). The emirates form the first-level administrative division of the Organization of the Kingdom of Saudi Arabia and are further divided into 136 governorates (muḥāfaẓāt), which are the second-level division, which are further subdivided into 1,347 municipal-level units (marakiz), and further subdivided into villages (qura) and neighborhoods (ahya).

Government 
Each emirate is governed by an Emir (Provincial Governor), who is assisted by the deputy emir, called nā'ib. The persons holding these positions are appointed by the King of Saudi Arabia. The emir is given the rank of minister, while the deputy emir is given the rank of excellence.

List of the Emirates of the Provinces of Saudi Arabia

See also
 ISO 3166-2:SA

References

External links

 
Subdivisions of Saudi Arabia
Saudi Arabia 1
Saudi Arabia 1
Regions, Saudi Arabia
Saudi Arabia geography-related lists